The highest-selling compact discs and music downloads in Mexico are ranked in the Top 100 Mexico record chart published weekly by AMPROFON (Asociación Mexicana de Productores de Fonogramas y Videogramas), a non-profit organization made up of Mexican and multinational record companies.

In 2008, 11 albums reached number-one in the chart, including Para Siempre, the 79th studio album by Vicente Fernández, spent 14 non-consecutive weeks at the top and was certified Diamond in México. The album also won the Latin Grammy Award for Best Ranchero Album in the 2008 ceremony, became the best-selling album of the year in México, and hit the top of the chart in the Billboard Top Latin Albums chart in the United States, where it was the second best-selling Latin album of the year.

Luis Miguel peaked at number-one with Cómplices, an album written and produced by Spanish lyricist Manuel Alejandro. The album received a nomination for the Grammy Award for Best Latin Pop Album. Another top album was Julieta Venegas' MTV Unplugged, a seventy-five-minute performance in Mexico City broadcast simultaneously in Mexico, Spain and the United States on June 5, 2008. Death Magnetic by Metallica and A Little Bit Longer by Jonas Brothers reached the top of the chart and also peaked at number-one in the Billboard 200 in the United States. Alejandro Fernández released two number-one albums in 2008: 15 Años de Éxitos and De Noche: Clásicos a Mi Manera; while Spanish singer-songwriter also hit twice the top of the chart, the first as the lead voice of Héroes del Silencio and as a solo artist with Hellville de luxe.

Albums

See also

List of number-one songs of 2008 (Mexico)

References

Number-one albums
Mexico
2008